Arabinda Mukhopadhyay (18 June 1919 – 10 February 2016) was an Indian filmmaker, film director and editor, who directed all-time classics like Nishi Padma (1970), Dhanyee Meye (1971) and Mouchak (1974). He also wrote stories and screenplays.

Early life and education 
Mukhopadhyay was born in Katihar District, Bihar on 18 June 1919. His family originally hailed from Sehakhala situated in Hooghly District of present-day West Bengal. His father, Satyacharan Mukhopadhyay, was a doctor, and his mother was Mrinalini Devi. His elder brother was the noted Bengali writer Balai Chand Mukhopadhyay.

Career
In a career spanning four decades,  he directed total 26 full-length films, 3 telefilms and 1 television serial.
His very first directorial effort “Kichukkhon” in 1959 give him a nomination for the president's award. Another movie of his, “Ahban”, was screened at the Cannes Film Festival in 1961. His inspiration was Bengali Filmmakers like Agradoot,  Debaki Bose, Bimal Roy, Niren Lahiri, Ajoy Kar.

Death
Mukhopadhyay died on February 10, 2016, at his Kolkata residence.

Awards and nominations
20th Filmfare Awards (1972) for Best Screenplay - Movie Amar Prem

Selected filmography

 Jeevan Sangeet (1968)
 Pita Putra (1969)
 Nishipadma (1970)
 Dhanyee Meye (1971)
 Mouchak (1974)
 Agnishwar (1975)
 Ajasra Dhanyabad (1976) 
 Mantramugdha (1977)
 Ae Prithibi Pantha Niwas (1977)
 Nadi Theke Sagare (1978)
 Paka Dekha (1980)
 Prayashchitta (1983)
 Sansarer Itikatha (1983)
 Arpita (1983)
 Ajante (1986)
 Barnachora
 Kenram Becharam
 Notun Jiban
 Nayikar Bhumkay

References

External links 
 

1919 births
Film directors from Bihar
Bengali film directors
Hindi film editors
Visva-Bharati University alumni
People from Katihar
20th-century Indian film directors
2016 deaths
Indian male screenwriters
Filmfare Awards winners
Film directors from Kolkata